George or Georg Wolff may refer to:

Georg Wolff (merchant) (1736–1828), Norwegian businessman and Danish consul in London
Georg Wolff (journalist) (1914-1996), German paramilitary office and journalist
George Wolff (1886-1952)
George W. Wolff (1848–1919), politician in Wisconsin
George Dering Wolff (1822–1894), American Protestant minister, later after a conversion an editor of Catholic publications

See also
George Wolf (1777–1840), Governor of Pennsylvania
George Wolfe (disambiguation)